Pirkko Marjatta Turpeinen (born 7 November 1940 in Helsinki) is a Finnish psychiatrist and politician. She was a Member of the Parliament of Finland, representing the Finnish People's Democratic League (SKDL) from 1983 to 1986 and the Democratic Alternative (DEVA) from 1986 to 1987. She has also been active in the Communist Party of Finland (SKP).

References

1940 births
Living people
Physicians from Helsinki
Communist Party of Finland politicians
Finnish People's Democratic League politicians
Democratic Alternative (Finland) politicians
Members of the Parliament of Finland (1983–87)
Finnish psychiatrists
University of Helsinki alumni
Politicians from Helsinki